With a Lotta Help from My Friends is a rock/jazz/funk fusion album by jazz pianist Junior Mance which was released on the Atlantic label in 1970.

Reception

Allmusic awarded the album 3 stars.

Track listing
 "Thank You (Falettinme Be Mice Elf Agin)" (Sylvester Stewart) - 4:18
 "Never Say Naw" (Percy Mayfield) - 4:04
 "Don't Rush Us" (Junior Mance, Billy Cobham, Chuck Rainey) - 5:09
 "Well I'll Be White Black" (Cobham) - 4:05
 "Home Groovin" (Mance) - 3:40
 "Spinning Wheel" (David Clayton-Thomas) - 4:57
 "Don't Cha Hear Me Callin' to Ya" (Rudy Stevenson) - 5:08

Personnel
Junior Mance - piano 
Eric Gale - guitar
Chuck Rainey - electric bass
Billy Cobham - drums

References

 

1970 albums
Junior Mance albums
Atlantic Records albums
Albums produced by Joel Dorn